Anton Alekseyevich Khodyrev (born 26 January 1992) is a Russian former footballer.

Career
Khodyrev made his professional debut for Spartak Moscow on 13 July 2010 in the Russian Cup game against FC Metallurg Lipetsk. His debut in the Russian Premier League came on 30 October 2010 in the starting line-up in a 2–1 win with FC Rostov.

References

External links
  Player page on the official FC Spartak Moscow website
 

1992 births
Footballers from Moscow
Living people
Russian footballers
Russia youth international footballers
Russia under-21 international footballers
Association football midfielders
FC Spartak Moscow players
FC Sibir Novosibirsk players
Russian Premier League players
FC Sokol Saratov players
FC Spartak-2 Moscow players